Kristian Marthinsen Kulset (born 1 October 1995) is a Norwegian former cyclist, who competed as a professional from 2016 to 2022 for .

His brother Sindre is also a professional cyclist on the same team.

References

External links

1995 births
Living people
Norwegian male cyclists
Cyclists from Oslo